KACH (1340 AM) is a radio station broadcasting a classic hits format to the Preston, Idaho, United States area. The station is currently owned by Val Cook, through licensee Preston Broadcasting, LLC.

History
The station signed on the air September 6, 1948, as KPST. In 1976, the station's current call letters were adopted. In April 1998, the station was purchased by Alan J. White, who had previously worked with KVEL. KACH also began broadcasting via FM, on a translator station K288AG, which is also licensed to Preston. The FM frequency is 105.5 MHz. The FM signal covers roughly the same area as the AM signal, except during nighttime hours when skywave propagation is present for KACH.

Effective August 28, 2018, Alan White sold KACH and the construction permit for as-yet-unlicensed translator K291CV to Val Cook's Preston Broadcasting for $235,000.

Translator
In addition to the main station, KACH is relayed by an FM translator to widen its broadcast area. The translator broadcasts from a peak located west of the KACH studios.

References

External links

Classic hits radio stations in the United States
ACH
Radio stations established in 1948
1948 establishments in Idaho